The 371st Infantry Division, (German: 371. Infanterie-Division) was an infantry division of the German Army during World War II, active from 1942 to 1945 in two separate instances.

History 
The 371st Infantry Division, part of the nineteenth wave of infantry divisions formed during the war, was formed at Beverloo Camp in Belgium on 17 February 1942 under the command of the 15th Army. The division nominally fell within the responsibility of Wehrkreis VI (military district VI) and had a home station at Münster. 

The division sent to the Eastern Front in June 1942 and was annihilated during the Battle of Stalingrad on 31 January 1943 while subordinated to the 6th Army. 

The division was re-established on 17 February 1943 in Brittany from recovered soldiers and replacement troops and reached again full division strength on 9 June 1943. 
The division was then initially entrusted with coastal protection tasks in Italy and were in December 1943 moved to Croatia to participate in anti-partisan operations. From there it went to northern Ukraine, Poland and Upper Silesia, where it fought in several defensive battles.

At the end of the war, the division surrendered to the Soviets in the Iglau – Deutsch-Brod area in the present-day Czech Republic.

Commanding officers
Generalleutnant Richard Stempel : 1. April 1942 - 26 January 1943 (suicide to avoid surrender)
Generalleutnant Hermann Niehoff : 1. April 1943 - 10 June 1944
Generalmajor Hans-Joachim Baurmeister : 10 June - 10 July 1944
Generalleutnant Hermann Niehoff : 10 July 1944 - 2 March 1945
Generalmajor Rolf Scherenberg : 2 March 1945 - 8 May 1945

Sources
Lexikon der Wehrmacht
Axis History

Military units and formations established in 1942
Military units and formations disestablished in 1945
Infantry divisions of Germany during World War II
German units at the Battle of Stalingrad